Millmont Red Bridge is a historic wooden covered bridge in Hartley Township, Union County, Pennsylvania. It crosses the Penns Creek. The bridge is no longer open to motor vehicles but foot traffic is permitted.

It was listed on the National Register of Historic Places in 1980.

References

Covered bridges on the National Register of Historic Places in Pennsylvania
Covered bridges in Union County, Pennsylvania
Bridges completed in 1855
Wooden bridges in Pennsylvania
Bridges in Union County, Pennsylvania
National Register of Historic Places in Union County, Pennsylvania
Road bridges on the National Register of Historic Places in Pennsylvania
Burr Truss bridges in the United States
1855 establishments in Pennsylvania